Stanisław Frączyk (born 2 December 1952) is a retired Austrian-Polish para table tennis player. He is a triple Paralympic champion, a triple World champion, an eleven-time European champion and three time Polish national champion.

He has a medical condition called Heine-Medina disease which is caused his right leg to be five centimetres short than his left leg, he plays with a splint on his right leg. He was encouraged to play the sport by his older brother Zbiginiew Frączyk who is also a table tennis player who played at national level.

References

External links
 

1952 births
Living people
Sportspeople from Łódź
People from Stockerau
Paralympic table tennis players of Austria
Polish male table tennis players
Austrian male table tennis players
Table tennis players at the 1996 Summer Paralympics
Table tennis players at the 2000 Summer Paralympics
Table tennis players at the 2004 Summer Paralympics
Table tennis players at the 2008 Summer Paralympics
Table tennis players at the 2012 Summer Paralympics
Table tennis players at the 2016 Summer Paralympics
Medalists at the 1996 Summer Paralympics
Medalists at the 2000 Summer Paralympics
Medalists at the 2004 Summer Paralympics
Medalists at the 2012 Summer Paralympics
Austrian emigrants to Poland
Sportspeople from Lower Austria